The first season of Dexter is an adaptation of Jeff Lindsay's first novel in a series of the same name, Darkly Dreaming Dexter.  Subsequent seasons have featured original storylines. This season aired from October 1, 2006 to December 17, 2006, and follows Dexter's (Michael C. Hall) investigation of "the Ice Truck Killer". Introduced in the first episode, "Dexter", this serial killer targets prostitutes and leaves their bodies severed and bloodless. At the same time, Dexter's adoptive sister, Debra Morgan (Jennifer Carpenter), a vice squad officer, aspires to work in the homicide department, and Dexter's girlfriend, Rita Bennett (Julie Benz), wants their relationship to be more intimate. Christian Camargo appears as Rudy Cooper and is a recurring character until the end of the season.

The season received critical acclaim, being praised as "bold, different and exciting, with a central character and performance that take your breath away" by the Daily News. The Wall Street Journal saw "the grotesqueries of Dexter" as "not something that can easily be dismissed with the old 'you don't have to watch' line", and concluded that, "We do have to live among the viewers who will be desensitized, or aroused, by this show". The season holds an 81% approval rating on Rotten Tomatoes, where the critical consensus reads, "Its dark but novel premise may be too grotesque for some, but Dexter is a compelling, elegantly crafted horror-drama."

The season received high ratings for Showtime; the pilot episode attracted more than a million viewers, giving the channel its highest ratings in nearly two years, while the finale "Born Free" drew an audience of 1.1 million viewers in the U.S. On average, the season was watched by two million viewers per episode during its original run when factoring in DVR viewers. 

Due to the 2007–2008 Writers Guild of America strike and encouraged by the show's critical success and high ratings on Showtime, CBS, a national terrestrial broadcast network, announced in December 2007 that it was considering airing an edited version of the first season of Dexter for free-to-air broadcast. It began to broadcast it on February 17, 2008, and thus, Dexter became the first program in 20 years to air on a broadcast network after being shown on a premium cable channel. During the show's rerun on the CBS network in 2008, the ratings were much higher, reaching 8.2 million viewers during its premiere in February, giving the network its best rating in the 10 p.m. time slot since December the previous year. During its 12-week run, it dropped to 7.1 million in early April, and to 6.6 million during the season's finale on May 6.

Plot 
Dexter Morgan, a blood spatter analyst for the Miami Metro Police Department, is secretly a serial killer, arising from a traumatic incident connected to the death of his mother when he was three years old. His adoptive father, Detective Harry Morgan, saw these homicidal tendencies in Dexter as he grew up, and took him on hunting trips to sate his desires to kill.  When Dexter admits to having desires to kill people, his adoptive father influences him to follow a "code": only kill murderers who have escaped prosecution of the law. Since Harry's death, Dexter has killed multiple people, all the while adhering to the code.  As his father has taught him, he covers his tracks by taking the victim to a prepared room lined with plastic sheeting in order to easily dispose of the evidence at sea. He only keeps a blood sample of the victim on a glass slide, stored in a box hidden in his apartment. Neither his adoptive sister Debra Morgan nor those in the department know about his secret killings, although Sgt. James Doakes is suspicious of how interested Dexter is in reviewing crime scenes. To help appear normal, Dexter has started dating Rita Bennett, the mother of Astor and Cody, and whose husband Paul is in jail due to drug-related crimes. Because of her abusive previous relationship with Paul, Dexter finds Rita has little interest in sex, keeping their relationship ideal for his purposes. Paul is eventually let out of prison, and tries to get back together with Rita, despite the fact that Rita is planning to divorce him. Seeing Paul get abusive with Rita, Dexter frames Paul for possession of illegal drugs, sending him back to prison.

A string of murders of prostitutes leads to the identification of a new serial killer called "the Ice Truck Killer", due to how the victims' bodies are well-preserved by being kept chilled before they are found. Dexter identifies patterns of the serial killer from his own habits, and lets Debra know, helping the department get a lead on the killer and leading to Debra's promotion to Homicide. Her investigation leads her to meet Rudy Cooper, a prosthetics expert, and they start a relationship. Meanwhile, Dexter discovers that the Ice Truck Killer has broken into his apartment and left taunting clues, leading Dexter to believe that the Killer is playing a game with him.

After being notified that he was left a house by his just-deceased biological father, Joe Driscoll, Dexter realizes that his adoptive father was not entirely truthful, and leads him to memories of how his mother died. A gruesome, blood-filled murder scene causes Dexter to recall what had happened: criminals had placed him and his mother, Laura Moser, in a shipping container, killed Laura and dismembered her with a chainsaw. Dexter was locked up in the container in a pool of his mother's blood, to be rescued by Harry two days later. Harry had purposely altered the records to prevent Dexter from finding out.

Through Debra, Rudy tries to get closer to Dexter. Dexter comes first to suspect that Joe was murdered, and later affirms that Rudy Cooper is the Ice Truck Killer. With his identity blown, Rudy kidnaps Debra and draws Dexter into a trap to rescue her. Rudy reveals to Dexter that he is his older brother, Brian Moser, also left in the shipping container when Laura was killed. However, unlike Dexter, he was sent off to live in a mental institution. Brian too has developed serial killer tendencies, but did not have the code that Harry instilled in Dexter, and so used the Ice Truck Killer approach to help Dexter recall his past. Brian suggests to Dexter that they kill Debra together, but Dexter refuses. Brian gets away after a fight, and Dexter rescues Debra.

As police investigate, Doakes suspects Dexter of knowing more about the Ice Truck Killer than he is letting on. Brian attempts to capture Debra again, but falls into a trap laid by Dexter. Dexter apologizes to Brian before killing him, and leaves Brian's body to make it appear as suicide. The police rule the Ice Truck Killer case closed, though Doakes keeps close tabs on Dexter, still suspicious of his actions. Rita discovers evidence that Dexter may have set up Paul.

Cast

Main cast 
 Michael C. Hall as Dexter Morgan
 Julie Benz as Rita Bennett
 Jennifer Carpenter as Debra Morgan
 Erik King as James Doakes
 Lauren Vélez as María LaGuerta
 David Zayas as Angel Batista
 James Remar as Harry Morgan

Recurring cast 
 C.S. Lee as Vince Masuka
 Christina Robinson as Astor Bennett
 Daniel Goldman as Cody Bennett
 Devon Graye, Dominic Janes and Maxwell Huckabee as young Dexter Morgan
 Geoff Pierson as Tom Matthews
 Christian Camargo as Brian Moser / Rudy Cooper
 Mark Pellegrino as Paul Bennett
 Brad William Henke as Tony Tucci
 Angela Alvarado as Nina Batista
 Sam Witwer as Neil Perry
 Sage Kirkpatrick as Laura Moser
 Margo Martindale as Camilla Figg

Guest cast 
 Rudolf Martin as Carlos Guerrero
 Mark L. Young as Jeremy Downs
 Judith Scott as Esme Pascal
Valerie Dillman as Valerie Castillo
Jim Abele as Mike Donovan
Ethan Smith as Jamie Jaworski
 Denise Crosby as Nurse Mary
 Gina Hecht as Mrs. Tucci
 José Zúñiga as Jorge Castillo
 Vernee Watson-Johnson as Ms. Doakes
 Tony Goldwyn as Emmett Meridian
 Malcolm-Jamal Warner as Rita's lawyer

Crew 

The series pilot was developed by James Manos, Jr. based on Jeff Lindsay's novel. Manos served as an executive producer for the pilot along with John Goldwyn and Sara Colleton. The pilot was produced by Dennis Bishop. Steven Brown also served as a producer for the pilot episode. Chad Tomasoski worked as an associate producer. The pilot was directed by Michael Cuesta.

Manos, Goldwyn and Colleton returned as executive producers for the first season. Mid-season Clyde Phillips became a fourth executive producer. Daniel Cerone joined the crew as a co-executive producer and writer. Pilot director Michael Cuesta returned as a co-executive producer and regular director. Melissa Rosenberg also joined the crew as a consulting producer and writer. Timothy Schlattmann served as a story editor and writer. Lauren Gussis worked as a staff writer throughout the first season. Dennis Bishop returned to produce further episodes but left midseason and was replaced by Robert Lloyd Lewis

Episodes

References

External links 

 
 

 
2006 American television seasons